Chak 38/3-R is a village of Haroonabad Tehsil in Bahawalnagar District in the Punjab province of Pakistan. It is situated on Dahranwala Haroonabad Road and is well connected with other cities. Chak 38/3-R is situated 20 km from Haroonabad and 10 km from Dahranwala

There is Government High School for Boys which is one of the oldest in area and was established in 1932 and High School for Girls which was established in 1958. There is also a Basic Health Unit in Chak 38/3-R.

Gallery

External links
 Chak 38/3-R photos on Panoramio

References

Populated places in Bahawalnagar District